Senator Schoonmaker may refer to:

Augustus Schoonmaker Jr. (1828–1894), New York State Senate
Marius Schoonmaker (1811–1894), New York State Senate